Myrtis of Anthedon (6th century BC) was an ancient Greek poet, purported to be the teacher of Pindar of Thebes and Corinna of Tanagra. Scholars believe that she was the earliest in the line of lyric poets who emerged from the district of Boeotia (Anthedon was a small town in the district of Boeotia, which adjoins Attica to the north-west).

All that is known of Myrtis' poetry can be surmised from Plutarch's (himself Boeotian) paraphrase of one of her prose poems (Greek Questions 40). Plutarch cites Myrtis as the source for the story that explained why women were forbidden to set foot in a sacred grove dedicated to a local hero, Eunostos, in the Boeotian town of Tanagra. Evidently Myrtis' poem related how a woman named Ochna, Eunostos' cousin, was rejected by him and, in a fit of anger and in despair over her unrequited love, she told her brothers that Eunostos had raped her, whereupon they killed Eunostus but were then taken captive by his father. Ochna, pitying her brothers, confessed her lie; they were allowed to go into exile, and Ochna ended her life by jumping from a cliff.

According to the Suda, Myrtis was called "sweet-sounding" by Antipater of Thessalonica and "clear-voiced" by Corinna. Antipater of Thessalonica included her in his canon of nine female poets. Apparently, Corinna also criticized Myrtis, as a woman, for venturing to compete with Pindar. Tatian, a 2nd-century AD travelling rhetorician and Christian apologist, said (Against the Greeks 33) that a bronze statue of Myrtis was made by the sculptor Boïscus, otherwise unknown.

References

Citations

Sources

Ancient Greek writers known only from secondary sources
Ancient Greek women poets
Ancient Boeotian poets
6th-century BC Greek people
6th-century BC Greek women